Theaflavin-3-gallate is a theaflavin derivative. It can be found in abundance in black tea and is produced during fermentation. It has been studied as a cancer-fighting chemical when combined with cisplatin against ovarian cancer cells.  Consuming large amounts of black tea has been reported to reduce the effects of aging in female populations.

See also
 List of phytochemicals in food

References

Thearubigins
Tropolones
Pyrogallols
Benzoate esters
Enediols